Woodside is an unincorporated community in Wood County, in the U.S. state of Ohio.

History
Woodside was platted in 1883. A post office called Woodside was in operation from 1883 until 1934.

References

Unincorporated communities in Wood County, Ohio
Unincorporated communities in Ohio